The Black Mask is a 1935 British crime film directed by Ralph Ince and starring Wylie Watson, Aileen Marson and Ellis Irving. It was made at Teddington Studios as a quota quickie by Warner Bros.' British subsidiary. The film's sets were designed by the studio's resident art director Peter Proud. It is now considered a lost film.

Cast
 Wylie Watson as Jimmie Glass  
 Aileen Marson as Jean McTavish  
 Ellis Irving as Verrell  
 Wyndham Goldie as Davidson  
 Joyce Kennedy as Lady McTavish  
 Herbert Lomas as Sir John McTavish  
 John Turnbull as Inspector Murray  
 Kate Cutler as Lady Mincott

References

Bibliography
 Low, Rachael. Filmmaking in 1930s Britain. George Allen & Unwin, 1985.
 Wood, Linda. British Films, 1927-1939. British Film Institute, 1986.

External links

1935 films
British crime films
1935 crime films
1930s English-language films
Films shot at Teddington Studios
Films directed by Ralph Ince
Warner Bros. films
British black-and-white films
1930s British films